Queer Campus Bangalore is a support group and safe space for queer youth in Bangalore, India. It is open to school, college, and university going youth in the city.

History
In October 2011, a couple of college going residents of the city came together to form a support group for queer youth. This Bangalore chapter of Queer Campus was started as part of a network of student queer groups across the country, the first of which was started in Delhi in June 2010. Other chapters of Queer Campus were started in Pune and Hyderabad.

Activities
 QCB meets on Saturday afternoons at the Swabhava Trust office in Sampangi Ramnagar, in central Bangalore.
 Quicknics - Some afternoons (mostly in the spring) are spent at Cubbon Park where members are welcome to bring in snacks and games.
 Screenings - Queer related movies, TV shows, and documentaries are often screened.
 Carnivals - Melas were organised in 2012 and 2013 which provided a platform for art, crafts, and performances.
 Diversity Fair - QCB helped organise the mela or diversity fair, the penultimate event of the Bengaluru Namma Pride March from 2012 - 2014, and 2017.

See also
 LGBT culture in Bangalore

References

2011 establishments in Karnataka
LGBT in India
Organizations established in 2011